The 1913 French Grand Prix was a Grand Prix motor race held at Amiens on 12 July 1913.

The race

The restriction on Grand Prix cars for 1913 included  an  minimum weight and an  maximum weight, as well as a  fuel consumption limit.
The buildup to the race and the race itself were marred by three fatal crashes. Bigio was killed testing his Itala before the race. In a separate incident before the race, Paul Zuccarelli was killed when his Peugeot crashed into a cart, and a spectator was killed when Kenelm Lee Guinness's Sunbeam crashed into a river. This made Amiens's fatality tally rise to 5 in the span of less than two months- 2 other people had been killed while testing on the roads being used for the circuit in May. After this race, this circuit- which included an 8-mile (13 km) long straight (which is now known as the D934)- was never used again for motor racing.

Georges Boillot won for the second year in succession, at an average speed of 72.141 mph (116.096 km/h).  The fastest lap was set by Paul Bablot, at an average speed of 76.718 mph (123.462 km/h).

Classification

References

French Grand Prix
French Grand Prix
Grand Prix